The 2022–23 Hyderabad FC season is the club's fourth competitive season since its inception in 2019 and fourth consecutive season in the Indian Super League. The season covers from 1 June 2022 to 31 May 2023.

Kits

Management team

Players
Players and squad numbers last updated on 15 February 2023. Appearances include all competitions.Note: Flags indicate national team as has been defined under FIFA eligibility rules. Players may hold more than one non-FIFA nationality.

New contracts

Transfers

In

Out

Loan in

Loan out

Pre-season

Competitions

Durand Cup

Hyderabad FC participated in the 131st edition of the Durand Cup. Hyderabad were drawn in Group C alongside Army Red, Chennaiyin, NEROCA and TRAU. The fixtures for the Group C were released on 21 July 2022.

Group stage

Knockout stage

Indian Super League

The fixtures for the league stage were announced on 1 September 2022.

League table

Results by matchday

Matches

ISL Playoffs

Semifinals

Super Cup

Group stage

Group B

Player statistics

Appearances and goals

Top scorers

Top assists

Clean sheets

Discipline

Summary

References

Hyderabad FC seasons
Hyderabad FC